Alexis Corbière (born 17 August 1968) is a French politician. A member of La France Insoumise (FI), he has been member of the National Assembly for the 7th constituency of the Seine-Saint-Denis department since 2017. Corbière is also a spokesperson for La France Insoumise and the party's leader Jean-Luc Mélenchon in the 2017 French presidential election.

A former member of the Revolutionary Communist League from 1993 to 1997, Corbière then joined the Socialist Party where he was elected as the deputy mayor for the 12th arrondissement of Paris in 2001 and would continue to hold this position until 2014. In 2008, Corbière, Mélenchon, and several others left the PS and founded the Left Party. He was also elected to the Council of Paris the same year. He headed FI's first national convention in the suburbs of Lille in 2016.

See also
 2017 French legislative election
 2022 French legislative election

References

1968 births
Living people
Deputies of the 15th National Assembly of the French Fifth Republic
La France Insoumise politicians
Revolutionary Communist League (France) politicians
Socialist Party (France) politicians
Left Party (France) politicians
People from Béziers
University of Montpellier alumni
Paris Diderot University alumni
Politicians from Occitania (administrative region)
Deputies of the 16th National Assembly of the French Fifth Republic
Members of Parliament for Seine-Saint-Denis